Nguyễn Đức Anh Quốc (born 19 July 1992) is a Vietnamese footballer who plays as a striker for V.League 2 club Phù Đổng.

Honours

Club
Nam Định
 V.League 2: 2017
 China-ASEAN Cities Football Invitational Tournament: 2016; runners-up: 2017

References

https://thethao247.vn/profile/nguyen-duc-anh-quoc-tt5129.html

1992 births
Living people
Vietnamese footballers
V.League 1 players
Association football forwards
Nam Định F.C. players